"Rover" is a song traditionally sung at the end of athletic contest victories by fans of the University of California Los Angeles. It is a parody of the song "I'm Looking Over a Four Leaf Clover". The UCLA Band arrangement opens with "There'll Be a Hot Time in the Old Town Tonight". Following the opening, the band then plays the chorus to "I'm Looking Over a Four Leaf Clover". The band and students sing the lyrics, then the band plays the chorus again.

History
The song "I'm Looking Over a Four Leaf Clover" was popularized in 1948 by Art Mooney. It was written in 1927 with words by Mort Dixon, and music by Harry M. Woods.  "There'll Be a Hot Time in the Old Town Tonight'" was written in 1886 with original lyrics by Joe Hayden and music by Theodore Metz, band leader of the McIntyre and Heath Minstrels.  The UCLA Band arrangement is titled "Stanford Game (1954)", implying that it was originally played during the halftime of that football game by the UCLA Band.

The current song originated in the late 1960s, when a band student wrote the parody lyrics to the tune of "I'm Looking Over a Four Leaf Clover" during a football game. The UCLA song was retitled simply "Rover".

At the height of the John Wooden era (1948–1975), "Rover" was played only after lopsided basketball victories. Now, "Rover" is played after all UCLA athletic victories immediately following the alma mater. The lyric "scattered all over the court" is changed to "scattered all over the field" when at a football or soccer match. Also, after the band sings the lyric "and in his head there's a great big dent" they jump off their seats or benches simultaneously and continue singing.

Lyrics
The lyrics to the song are as follows:

Song notes
 The words "all right" and "next page" in parentheses above originate from the days in the 1960s and 1970s when the UCLA student spirit organization, Rally Committee, wrote the words in markers on cards borrowed from the card stunts performed at football games. In card-stunt style, only the cards with the current and next line of lyrics were shown to the crowd; the other cards were reversed, with a half-dozen Rally Committee members standing in front of the crowd each with a card and turning them at the proper time. The words "(All Right!)" (parentheses included) appeared at the bottom of the card with the line "that we overran tonight", and the words "(Next Page)" (also parentheses included) followed the lyrics "are scattered all over the court". As a joke, the students sang the words in parentheses, and they eventually became part of the tradition.
 During the annual game against traditional rival USC, the lyrics are changed slightly, changing the word "dog" to "horse", as a parody of the Trojans' horse mascot, Traveler.
 Following "And in his head, there's a great big dent", singers jump on the bleachers to make the "crashing" sound.
 During the run of NCAA basketball championships, the UCLA Band reserved an arrangement of the "Hallelujah Chorus" to be played only after a victory in the championship game.
 Other arrangements have been recorded including
 "My Dead Dog Rover" by Hank Stu Dave and Hank (Hank Landsberg and Dave Whited) from 1977, which appears on the Dr. Demento 25th Anniversary Collection
 "I’m Lookin’ Over My Dead Dog Rover" by Kevin Gershon from 1973 and played on KMET FM in Los Angeles

See also
 "Mighty Bruins" - UCLA fight song from 1984
 "Hail to the Hills of Westwood" - UCLA alma mater
 "Strike Up The Band" - UCLA official song
 "Sons of Westwood"

References

External links
 UCLA History Project: UCLA Traditions (original text taken from there)

UCLA Bruins
University of California, Los Angeles